LOTTO24, (a member of the ZEAL Group) headquartered in Hamburg, Germany, is an online provider of state licensed lotteries. The company was founded in 2010 and brokers customer tickets under the brands LOTTO24 and Tipp24 to the 16 state-owned lottery companies of the country's federal states, for which it receives a commission. The product range includes LOTTO 6aus49, Spiel 77, Super 6, Eurojackpot, GlücksSpirale, lotto clubs, Keno and Deutsche Fernsehlotterie. In addition, the company launched the new social lottery freiheit+ for the promotion of educational projects together with BildungsChancen gGmbH under the Tipp24 brand on 9 March 2020.

LOTTO24's shares have been traded on the Frankfurt Stock Exchange since 2012. As of 31 December 2016, there were 24,154,890 issued shares. However, in the course of the capital reduction, the number of shares was reduced to 1,610,326 shares in August 2020.

History 
LOTTO24 was founded in Hamburg in 2010. The company was formed when the current Zeal Network SE span off its German business. It went public on 3 July 2012 and its shares have since been listed in the Prime Standard segment of the Frankfurt Stock Exchange. Shortly before its IPO, the second State Treaty on Games of Chance (Glückspielstaatsvertrag - GlüStV) came into effect in Germany on 1 July 2012 which repealed the ban on online marketing of state lotteries included in the first GlüStV (2008). LOTTO24 was one of the first private providers to receive a state permit for the marketing of online lotteries in September 2012.  This was followed by a permit for TV and online advertising in March 2013. Both permits were prolonged accordingly.

In 2014, LOTTO24 released mobile applications for iOS and Android which enable lotto players to submit their tickets via smartphone and tablet. After the iOS apps from LOTTO24 and Tipp24 have been available via the Apple App Store for some time, the fully playable Android apps from LOTTO24 and the Tipp24 app have been available for download in the Google Play Store since the end of March and the end of April 2021 to disposal.

LOTTO24 was taken over by ZEAL Network SE in May 2019 and has been part of the ZEAL Group ever since.

Finances 
In its fiscal year 2019, LOTTO24 AG posted billings of €366.5 million and revenues of €44.1 million. Compared to 2018, these figures represent growth of 14 percent and 15 percent, respectively. The number of new registered customers in the fiscal year 2019 was 397 thousand. According to information supplied by the German Lottery Association, the company is the market leader in online lottery sales with a market share of the German online segment of 35 percent. In 2019, online lottery revenues amounted to €1.0 billion. This represents around 14 percent of the total lottery market with stakes of almost €7.3 billion.

Services 
LOTTO24 is a licensed provider of state lotteries via the internet. The product range includes:
 LOTTO 6aus49 (Wednesday and Saturday)
 Spiel 77
 Super 6
 EuroJackpot
 GlücksSpirale
 Lotto Clubs
 Keno
 Deutsche Fernsehlotterie
 freiheit+

References

External links 
 
 Online Betting Guide

Online gambling companies of Germany
Gambling companies established in 2010
Companies based in Hamburg